Tarcísio Pereira de Magalhães Sobrinho (5 October 1935 – 12 August 2021), known professionally as Tarcísio Meira, was a Brazilian actor. He was one of the first actors to work in the most popular Brazilian channel Globo. He was born in São Paulo and was the longtime owner of Fazenda São Marcos, a 5000 ha cattle ranch in the eastern Amazonian state of Pará. Fazenda São Marcos is located approximately 20 km east of Aurora do Pará, off the Belém-Brasília highway.

Life and career 
Meira was a descendant of the Portuguese-born landowning family de Magalhães, who had lived in Brazil since the early 18th century; he aspired to a career as a diplomat, but after being rejected by the Rio Branco Institute, he devoted himself entirely to acting, for which he chose his mother's maiden name, Meira, as his stage name. From 1957 on, he appeared regularly on the theater stage. His first television role was in 1961 in the telenovela Maria Antonieta, and his first appearance in a feature film was in 1963 in Casinha Pequenina. Also in 1963, Meira played a leading role in the first daily broadcast telenovela in Brazil, 2-5499 Ocupado.

Meira was married to actress Glória Menezes since 1962. Their son together (b. 1964) also became a well-known actor under the stage name Tarcísio Filho. In 1968, Meira and Menezes were signed by the television network Rede Globo as permanent cast members for telenovelas. Their first telenovela produced by Rede Globo, Sangue e Areia (1968), based on Vicente Blasco Ibáñez's novel Blood and Sand, enjoyed great public success. Afterwards, Meira and Menezes were also frequently cast as married couples or lovers. In the 1980s, Meira increasingly appeared in feature films and television miniseries, but kept working in telenovelas and stage as well.

Death 
Tarcisio Meira was hospitalized on 6 August with COVID-19. He died from the virus on 12 August 2021, at the Hospital Albert Einstein in São Paulo.

Filmography

Film 

1963: Casinha Pequenina – Nestor
1965: A Desforra
1969: Máscara da Traição – Carlos Almeida
1970: Verão de Fogo – Killer
1970: Quelé do Pajeú – Clemente Celidônio / Quelé
1970: Amemo Nus (unfinished)
1971: As Confissões de Frei Abóbora
1972: Missão: Matar – José da Silva
1972: Independência ou Morte – Pedro I of Brazil
1974: O Marginal – Valdo
1977: Elza e Helena
1979: República Dos Assassinos – Mateus
1979: O Caçador de Esmeraldas – Capitão-Mor
1980: A Idade da Terra – Military Christ
1981: Eu Te Amo – Ulisses
1981: O Beijo no Asfalto – Aprígio
1982: Amor Estranho Amor – Dr. Osmar / politician
1983: O Cangaceiro Trapalhão
1987: Eu – Marcelo / Father
1989: Solidão, Uma Linda História de Amor
1990: Boca de Ouro – Boca
1994: Boca – Boca
2011: Não Se Preocupe, Nada Vai Dar Certo – Ramon Velasco

Soap operas 

1963: 2-5499 Ocupado – Larry
1964: Ambição – Miguel (TV Excelsior)
1965: A Deusa Vencida – Edmundo Amarante (TV Excelsior)
1966: Almas de Pedra – Eduardo (TV Excelsior)
1967: O Grande Segredo – Celso (TV Excelsior)
1967: Sangue e Areia – Juan Gallardo
1968: A Gata de Vison – Bob Ferguson
1969: Rosa Rebelde – Sandro / Fernando de Aragón
1970: Irmãos Coragem – João Coragem
1971: O Homem que Deve Morrer – Ciro Valdez
1973: Cavalo de Aço – Rodrigo Soares
1973: O Semideus – Hugo Leonardo Filho / Raúl de Paula
1975: Escalada – Antônio Dias
1976: Saramandaia – D. Pedro I (special participation)
1977: Espelho Mágico – Diogo Maia
1979: Os Gigantes – Fernando Lucas
1980: Coração Alado – Juca Pitanga
1981: Brilhante – Paulo César
1983: Guerra dos Sexos – Felipe de Alcântara Pereira Barreto
1986: Roda de Fogo – Renato Villar
1990: Araponga – Aristênio Catanduva (Araponga)
1992: De Corpo e Alma – Diogo
1993: Fera Ferida – Feliciano Mota da Costa (special participation)
1994: Pátria Minha – Raul Pellegrini
1996: O Rei do Gado – Giuseppe Berdinazzi (special participation in the first phase)
1998: Torre de Babel – César Toledo
2001: Um Anjo Caiu do Céu – João Medeiros
2002: O Beijo do Vampiro – Bóris Vladesco
2004: Senhora do Destino – José Carlos Tedesco (special participation)
2005: Bang Bang – John McGold (special participation)
2006: Páginas da Vida – Tide (Aristides Martins de Andrade)
2008: A Favorita – Copola
2016: A Lei do Amor – Fausto Leitão
2018: Orgulho e Paixão – Sir George Magnus Williamson (Lorde Williamson)
2020: Os Casais que Amamos – Himself

Series 
1984: Meu destino é pecar – Paulo de Oliveira
1985: O Tempo e o Vento – Capitão Rodrigo Cambará
1985: Grande Sertão: Veredas – Hermógenes
1988: Tarcísio & Glória – Bruno Lazzarini
1998: Hilda Furacão – Coronel João Possidônio (participation)
2000: A Muralha – Dom Jerônimo Taveira
2004: Um Só Coração – Antônio de Sousa Borba (Colonel Totonho)

References

External links 

1935 births
2021 deaths
Male actors from São Paulo
Brazilian male film actors
Brazilian male telenovela actors
20th-century Brazilian male actors
21st-century Brazilian male actors
Brazilian people of Portuguese descent
Deaths from the COVID-19 pandemic in São Paulo (state)